The 1st Newcastle Journal Trophy was a non-championship Formula Two motor race held at Charterhall on 11 October 1952. The race was won by Dennis Poore in a Connaught Type A-Lea Francis, leading home his teammates Kenneth McAlpine and Mike Oliver. Tony Gaze set fastest lap in his HWM-Alta.

Stirling Moss finished fourth in the troublesome ERA G-Type-Bristol; this was the last race entered by the works ERA team.

Results

References

Newcastle Journal Trophy
Newcastle
Newcastle
Newcastle Journal Trophy